The Peshekee River is a  river on the Upper Peninsula of Michigan in the United States. It is a tributary of Lake Michigamme, and its waters flow via the Michigamme River and the Menominee River to Lake Michigan.

See also
List of rivers of Michigan

References

Michigan  Streamflow Data from the USGS

Rivers of Michigan
Tributaries of Lake Michigan